Antonio Tsankov (born 7 February 1990) is a Bulgarian footballer who plays as a midfielder for Oborishte Panagyurishte.

Career
On 8 October 2016, Tsankov joined Pirin Gotse Delchev but returned to Oborishte in January 2017.

References

External links
 

1990 births
Living people
Bulgarian footballers
FC Maritsa Plovdiv players
FC Lokomotiv 1929 Sofia players
FC Oborishte players
PFC Pirin Gotse Delchev players
Association football midfielders
First Professional Football League (Bulgaria) players